is a Japanese actress, voice actress and singer from Chigasaki. She is currently affiliated with Aoni Production. She is famous for voice acting roles such as Kaihime/Princess Kai from Samurai Warriors and Warriors Orochi series both from 3 and 4.

Filmography

Anime
 Katekyo Hitman Reborn! – Lal Mirch
 Legendz – Mike "Mac" McField
 Slayers series– Amelia Wil Tesla Seyruun
 Medabots - Kikuhime (Samantha), Brass
 Gate Keepers – Yukino Hojo
 Gate Keepers 21 – Yukino Hojo
 Akazukin Chacha – Chacha (debut role)
 Yu-Gi-Oh! Duel Monsters – Ghost Kotsuzuka
 Yu-Gi-Oh! GX – Marufuji Sho
 One Piece – Apis, Aisa, The Medaka Mermaid Quintuplets, Young Vinsmoke Ichiji, Capone Pez, Cosette, and Charlotte Cinnamon
 Lost Universe – Nina Mercury
 Suzuka – Yuuka Saotome
 Ghost Hunt – Ayako Matsuzaki
 Mizuiro Jidai – Yuuko Kawai
 Kakurenbo – Sorincha
 Penguin Musume Heart – Maguro Hōjiro
 Saint October – Ewan
 Shura no Toki – Tsubura Sanada
 Samurai Warriors 3 – Kaihime
 Dragon Ball Kai – Bee
Shimajiro: A World of Wow! - Nikki
 Tales of Phantasia: The Animation –  (She sings the opening and closing themes)

Video games
 Yakuza 3 - Katase

Drama CD
From Far Away CD Drama (1999): Tachiki Noriko

References

External links
 Official agency profile 
 

1972 births
Living people
Aoni Production voice actors
Japanese women singers
Japanese stage actresses
Japanese video game actresses
Japanese voice actresses
Voice actresses from Kanagawa Prefecture
20th-century Japanese actresses
21st-century Japanese actresses